The Anniversary Waltz is a popular song written by Dave Franklin, the lyrics by Al Dubin.

History 
The song was published in 1941. The title "Anniversary Waltz" is often mistakenly and confusingly used to refer to the entirely unrelated Anniversary Song, whose melody is a Romanian tune composed in 1880.

Bing Crosby recorded the song on July 14, 1941 for Decca Records with Victor Young and His Orchestra. The song briefly charted in the USA reaching the No. 24 spot.

The song has also been covered by Vera Lynn, Connie Francis, and Mantovani.

Ricky Ricardo performed the song to end the I Love Lucy episode "Hollywood Anniversary" (season 4 episode 4).

References

External links
Lyrics of the Franklin & Dubin song at International Lyrics Playground

Songs with lyrics by Al Dubin
1941 songs
Songs with music by Dave Franklin